The 16th Empire Awards ceremony (officially known as the Jameson Empire Awards), presented by the British film magazine Empire, honored the best films of 2010 and took place on 27 March 2011 at the Grosvenor House Hotel in London, England. During the ceremony, Empire presented Empire Awards in 11 categories as well as three honorary awards. Irish comedian Dara Ó Briain hosted the show for the third consecutive year. The awards were sponsored by Jameson Irish Whiskey for the third consecutive year.

In related events, Empire and Jameson Irish Whiskey held the 2nd Done In 60 Seconds Competition Global Final on 25 March 2011 at the London Film Museum, London, England. The team of judges consisted of Empire editor-in-chief Mark Dinning, Irish actor and comedian Chris O'Dowd and English director Neil Marshall, which selected from a shortlist of 24 nominees the five Done In 60 Seconds Award finalists that were invited to the Empire Awards where the winner was announced.

Kick-Ass won two awards including Best British Film. Other winners included The Girl with the Dragon Tattoo also with two awards and Four Lions, Harry Potter and the Deathly Hallows – Part 1, Inception, Let Me In, Scott Pilgrim vs. the World, The King's Speech and The Last Exorcism with one. Keira Knightley received the Empire Hero Award, Gary Oldman received the Empire Icon Award and Edgar Wright received the Empire Inspiration Award. Maeve Stam from the Netherlands won the Done In 60 Seconds Award for her 60-second film version of 127 Hours.

Winners and nominees
Winners are listed first and highlighted in boldface.

Multiple awards
The following two films received multiple awards:

Multiple nominations
The following 13 films received multiple nominations:

Done In 60 Seconds films

References

External links
 
 
 Live blog at HeyUGuys
 Live blog  at Ultra Culture

Empire Award ceremonies
2010 film awards
2011 in London
2011 in British cinema
March 2011 events in the United Kingdom
2010s in the City of Westminster